The Old Cadillac City Hall is a government building located at 201 Mitchell Street in Cadillac, Michigan.  It was designated a Michigan State Historic Site in 1983 and listed on the National Register of Historic Places in 1986.

History
In 1899, the citizens of Cadillac voted to construct a new City Hall. Architect William W. Williamson designed the building, and A.W. Muhnek of Grand Rapids, Michigan began construction in 1900. However, the builder failed, without an adequate bond, and in early 1901 builder J. R. Fletcher had to be brought in to finish the project.  The structure was used by the city of Cadillac until 1977, when a new Cadillac City Hall was constructed. The building was vacant for seven years, and was later renovated for commercial and office use.

Description
The Old Cadillac City Hall is a three-story building constructed of brick with stone facing with a steeply pitched slate roof.  The building has Richardsonian Romanesque detailing, including the arched doors and windows. The first floor contains rectangular windows in rectangular opening, the second floor contains round-headed window openings, and the third floor has steeply sloped stone gables. Stone steps approach the monumental, centrally located arched main entrance broad, set into a slightly projecting, entrance pavilion. The pavilion is topped with a peaked gable roof. The east side contains arched stone openings defining the entrances to the original fire station.

The interior of the building has an ornamental staircase connecting the floors. The lower level has a vaulted brick ceiling underneath the fire truck area above.

References

City and town halls on the National Register of Historic Places in Michigan
Romanesque Revival architecture in Michigan
Government buildings completed in 1900
Buildings and structures in Wexford County, Michigan
Michigan State Historic Sites
National Register of Historic Places in Wexford County, Michigan
City and town halls in Michigan